The 2019–20 Long Beach State Beach men's basketball team represented California State University, Long Beach in the 2019–20 NCAA Division I men's basketball season. The Beach were led by thirteenth-year head coach Dan Monson and played their home games at the Walter Pyramid as members of the Big West Conference. They finished the season 11–21, 6–10 in Big West play to finish in a tie for seventh place. They were set to be the No. 8 seed in the Big West tournament. However, the Big West tournament was canceled amid the COVID-19 pandemic.

The 2019–20 season was the first for their athletics' program's new nickname, Beach. They had previously been known as the 49ers through 2018–19.

Previous season 

Long Beach State finished the 2018–19 season 15–19 overall, and 8–8 in conference play. They lost in the second round of the Big West Conference tournament in Anaheim, having defeated 4th-seeded Hawaii in the first round before losing to top seed UC Irvine 67–75, ending their season.

Roster

Schedule 

|-
!colspan=12 style=""| Non-conference regular season

|-
!colspan=12 style=""| Big West regular season

|-
!colspan=12 style=""| Big West tournament

References 

Long Beach State
Long Beach State Beach men's basketball seasons
Long Beach State
Long Beach State